The Metropolitan Police Act 1829 (10 Geo.4, c.44) is an Act of the Parliament of the United Kingdom, introduced by Sir Robert Peel, which established the London Metropolitan Police (with the exception of the City of London), replacing the previously disorganized system of parish constables and watchmen. It is one of the Metropolitan Police Acts 1829 to 1895.

The Act 
The Act was the enabling legislation for what is often considered to be the first modern police force, the "bobbies" or "peelers" (after Peel), which served as the model for modern urban policing throughout Britain. Until the passage of the Act, the Statute of Winchester of 1285 was cited as the primary legislation regulating the policing of the country since the Norman Conquest.

See also 

 History of law enforcement in the United Kingdom
 History of the Metropolitan Police
 Peelian principles

References

Citations

Notes

Further reading
 
 Gash, Norman.  Mr. Secretary Peel (1962) 1:477-507
 Harrison, Arch. "The English Police 1829-1856: Consensus or Conflict" International Journal of Police Science & Management 2 (1999): 175+

External links
Inspector Denning - Victorian Police in Westminster - UK Parliament Living Heritage
Metropolitan Police Act 1829 on the UK Parliament website
Metropolitan Police; Time Line 1829 - 1849
learnhistory.org.uk Crime, Punishment and Protest Through Time, c.1450-2004

United Kingdom Acts of Parliament 1829
Acts of the Parliament of the United Kingdom concerning London
History of the Metropolitan Police
1829 in London
Police legislation in the United Kingdom
Robert Peel